The H. H. Coffield Unit (CO) is a Texas Department of Criminal Justice prison for men in unincorporated Anderson County, Texas. The prison, near Tennessee Colony, is along Farm to Market Road 2054. The unit, on a  plot of land, is co-located with Beto, Gurney, Michael, and Powledge units. With a capacity of 4,139 inmates, Coffield is the TDCJ's largest prison. Coffield opened in June 1965.

In 2011 the Stiles Unit metal products plant closed. Its operations were consolidated with those of Coffield and Powledge Unit.

Coffield has employee housing.

In early 2019 Gateway Church opened its first prison campus inside Coffield.

References

External links

 "Coffield Unit." Texas Department of Criminal Justice.
 Byrd, Sid Hawk. "Life and Death in a Cold, Lonely Cell." Texas Observer. Friday November 16, 2007.

Prisons in Anderson County, Texas
1965 establishments in Texas